Jazan (also known as Gaz) is a village in Howmeh Rural District, in the Central District of Damghan County, Semnan Province, Iran. At the 2006 census, its population was 1,292, in 340 families.

References 

Populated places in Damghan County